Dierogekko thomaswhitei, also known commonly as White's nimble gecko and the  Taom striped gecko, is a species of lizard in the family Diplodactylidae. The species is endemic to New Caledonia.

Etymology
The specific name, thomaswhitei, is in honor of "Dr. Thomas White".

Geographic range
D. thomaswhitei is found on the island of Grande Terre, in North Province, New Caledonia.

Habitat

Description

Reproduction
D. thomaswhitei is oviparous.

References

Further reading
Bauer AM, Jackman T, Sadlier RA, Whitaker AH (2006). "A Revision of the Bavayia validiclavis group (Squamata: Gekkota: Diplodactylidae), a Clade of New Caledonian Geckos Exhibiting Microendemism". Proceedings of the California Academy of Sciences 57 (18): 503–547. (Dierogekko thomaswhitei, new species, pp. 515–518, Figures 10–13).

Dierogekko
Reptiles described in 2006
Taxa named by Aaron M. Bauer
Taxa named by Todd R. Jackman
Taxa named by Ross Allen Sadlier
Taxa named by Anthony Whitaker
Geckos of New Caledonia